The AEG C.VI was a prototype two-seat biplane reconnaissance aircraft of World War I. It was developed in 1916 from the AEG C.IV, but did not enter production.

Specifications (AEG C.VI)

References

See also

C.VI
Single-engined tractor aircraft
Biplanes
1910s German military reconnaissance aircraft
Aircraft first flown in 1916